Percy Carpenter (1820–1895), son of artists William Hookham Carpenter and Margaret Sarah Carpenter, was a painter active in the mid-19th century.

Biography
Carpenter studied painting in the British Royal Academy and exhibited there, and at the British Institution ca. 1841–1842.  From 1851 to 1858 he worked in Asia, producing works exhibited in the National Museum of Singapore and the Royal Academy.

In 1859, he was in India, where he produced works now exhibited in the India Office Library and published in books. In 1861 he published "Boar Hunting in India" which included "The Charge" (see illustration).  Like his father, he also served as a Keeper of Prints at the British Museum.  He was a friend of art critic, illustrator, and director of the British National Portrait Gallery, Sir George Scharf.

Gallery

References

1820 births
1895 deaths
Painters from London
Employees of the British Museum
British curators
Directors of the National Portrait Gallery, London
19th-century British businesspeople